The Guča Trumpet Festival, also known as the Dragačevski Sabor ( or Dragačevo Fair (Fete, Gathering or Assembly)), is an annual brass band festival held in the town of Guča, near the city of Čačak, in the Dragačevo region of western Serbia. Guča is a three-hour bus ride from Belgrade.

600,000 visitors make their way to the town of 2,000 inhabitants every year, both from Serbia and abroad.  Elimination heats are held earlier in the year and only a few dozen bands qualify to compete.  Guča's official festival has three parts, Friday's opening concert, Saturday night's celebrations and Sunday's competition. The Friday's concerts are held at the entrance to the official Guča Festival building. This event features previous winners, each band getting to play three tunes while folk dancers, all kitted out in bright knitting patterns, dance kolos and oros in front of a hyped-up audience.

History

Trumpet in Serbia 

Though today considered a typical traditional instrument in Serbian folk music, trumpet entered folk music in full only at the beginning of the 20th century. Records show that trumpeters were part of the Serbian army of prince Stefan Vojislav, which defeated the Byzantines in the Battle of Bar on the Rumija mountain in 1042. Together with the drummers, they are mentioned being in the armies of prince Lazar Hrebeljanović and his successors, despots Stefan Lazarević and Đurađ Branković in the 14th and 15th century. In all that period, trumpet was only used as a military instrument.

As Serbia was liberated from the Ottomans after the Second Serbian Uprising in 1815, Serbian prince Miloš Obrenović formed the band at his court in Kragujevac. As the new state was still under heavy Ottoman influence, the band played oriental music. It was headed by the very popular violin and zurna player, Mustafa. He was titled oberlautar (chief singer) or in Serbian, bukadžija, which literally means the "noise maker". In order to westernize the state, prince Miloš dismissed Mustafa in 1831 and invited Josif Šlezinger (1794-1870), a musician and composer from Sombor, to form the first military orchestra, with the European instruments, so the trumpet was returned to the orchestras.

The trumpet became popular in the villages of Serbia during the late 19th century. Author Momo Kapor wrote: "In Serbia, who from old times new about gusle, shepherd flutes, flutes and dvojnice, the trumpets were accepted after the Serbo-Turkish wars in the late 19th century, when the company and regimental trumpeters returned to their villages, bringing with them their hit, dented, beaten and often bullet pierced trumpets". After the World War I it became the most popular folk instrument, suppressing the previously dominant gaida and violin (in folk music called ćemane). The amateur players were originally taught by the former professional military trumpeters, like Momir Miletić, Momir Subotić and Dojčilo Đukić. The village orchestras were mostly disbanded during the World War II, but after 1945 they were renewed. In time, three schools of brass music developed: eastern (Zaječar, Boljevac), southern (Vranje, Surdulica, Vladičin Han) and western (Užice, Čačak, Požega).

Festival 

The idea for the festival came from the reporter of Politika, Blagoje Radivojević (1925-2016). He was correspondent from Čačak where in 1961 he noticed a band of trumpeters, playing the farewell to the brigade of the Youth work actions at Čačak's railway station. He suggested to the local administration in the Lučani municipality (to which the region of Dragačevo and the town of Guča administratively belong), to add the trumpeters, as the "special musical heritage of this part of Serbia", to the already existing festival "Dragačevo through sing and dance". The suggestion evolved into the separate trumpet festival. Radivojević, with the help of author , unsuccessfully urged many individuals and organizations in order to gain the support for the project, until they made contact with one of highest authorities in Serbia at the time, a politician and former intelligence officer Slobodan Penezić Krcun. He allowed it, but warned them: "all right, but I don't want to hear about any Serbian nationalism there" (dobro, ali nemoj da čujem da je bilo nekakvog srbovanja).

The inaugural festival was held on 16 October 1961 in the churchyard of the Church of St.Michael and St. Gabriel in Guča, with 4 orchestras from the neighboring villages competing. The winner was Desimir Perišić (1919–83), who is, as of 2017, still the only local musician who won the competition. He was nicknamed "Dragačevo's Harry James". On 10 August 2010 a monument to Perišić was dedicated on the new roundabout at the entrance into Guča from Lučani direction. At the first festival, each band had to play five songs. Two obligatory were Sa Ovčara i Kablara and Bledi mesec zagrlio zvezdu danicu, plus two kolos and a march by choice.

The festival gained a wider popularity since 1970, when it became more present in the media. That year, it was described as a "different, colorful, village Serbia, open for all well-meaning people, no matter where they come from". Today, apart from the regular brass orchestras, the competition also includes the children and youth orchestras. By 2017, it grew into the largest trumpet festival, third ethno-festival and one of the 15 largest festivals in the world. In Serbia, it gained a reputation of an unofficial state celebration.

Initially, it was a very modest Assembly - almost subversive for the prevailing political circumstances of the time. However, the Assembly gradually grew and expanded its magical influence, and over the past ten or so years has become the folk remained its key symbol and raison d'etre. It is no longer held solely for the trumpet players. It has grown into a gathering of toastmasters, painters. The song Sa Ovčara i Kablara marks the beginning of the festival each year. Some church music festivals notwithstanding, the Assembly of Trumpet Players is the best known event of this kind extending uninterruptedly for 43 years and attracting guests and musicians alike from every continent. Trumpet players and Folk Song and Dance groups from around the world feel it a great honor to be invited to the Assembly, and the number of visitors increases with each coming year.

The village of Guča has gained world fame owing to its Assembly of Trumpet Players, the largest trumpet event on the planet. The traditional Dragačevo Trumpet - its cult kept alive for nearly two centuries regardless of political and social considerations - has with time become world-famous. It is due to the trumpet that the name of Serbia has resounded worldwide, on all continents.  The virtuoso music performers, the trumpet players that compete are in the most part self-taught. They play by ear and quite spontaneously, relying on their musical memory; they play from their hearts and souls, and their music reaches out to listeners precisely because of this. The Guča Sabor (Gathering) of Trumpet Players continues to grow year after year. Today, this musical feast of recognizable national skills is more popular, more diverse and bigger than ever before.

With considerable experience in organizing Assemblies, today the traditionally hospitable Guča has earned its place on the map of world music festivals, inviting high interest from ethno music lovers, and deservedly so. As an internationally recognized trumpet capital, and a singular corner of positive energy, a place with accumulated joy, gaiety and spontaneity, coupled with the piercing yet gentle sound of the trumpet, Guča is a place of catharsis of the heart and soul while the festival lasts. All this is more than enough to attract visitors to Guča from Mexico, Spain, Greece, Denmark, China and other countries. The names of Boban Marković, Ekrem Sajdić, Elvis Ajdinović, Fejat and Zoran Sejdić have carried the glory of the Serbian trumpet across the world.
Official website of the Guča trumpet festival

Characteristics 

The sound of the trumpet traditionally accompanies every major event in Serbia's rural and small communities' life: births, baptisms, weddings, slava (family patron saint day), farewell parties for those joining military service, state and church festivals, harvesting, reaping, and also funerals. Appropriate music is played on these occasions, thus preserving the spirit of the existing tradition. The music is very diverse: from indigenous melodies, like kolo {a fast-rhythm chain dance}, marches and characteristic southern Serbia čoček dances, all the way to tunes that have emerged more recently, but always taking care to honour old harmonies. This music has won over the hearts of not only the local population, but has also warmed the hearts of many foreigners. In the several days of the Guča Festival, hardly anyone can resist giving themselves to the adrenalin-rushing rhythms and melodies that simply force one to jump to one's feet and dance.

It is estimated that in 1961-2017 period, the festival had 16 million visitors.

Recent festivals 

2001 -  2001 was the first time ever that a musician, Boban Marković, got the highest mark from every jury member. Since then, Boban decided not to compete any more.  Instead he performs three or four songs as a special guest at each festival thereafter.  Attending the competition this year, among other dignitaries, were Princess Katherine of Yugoslavia (from the line of Black George, to whose uprising the music can be traced), and Zoran Đinđić, the prime minister.
2002 - Attendance record was set in 2002, when Guča hosted in excess of 300,000 visitors.
2005 - A documentary about the festival was filmed at the 2005 event. In a visit to festival came Kiera Chaplin granddaughter of Charlie Chaplin.
The majority of the 1500 participants of the 46th festival were Romani from around the region. Serbian brewery MB, the main sponsor of the 2006 festival, reported beer sales of 4,000 hectoliters, or more than 700,000 British pints. The event has also become lucrative for various travel agencies throughout Europe.  While visiting the festival, Prime Minister Vojislav Koštunica stated:

2007 - On 10 August Goran Bregović who popularised the Serbian trumpet sound and Balkan ethno music internationally, performed at Guča.
2020 - In April, the festival was rescheduled from August to October due to the COVID-19 pandemic. However, in July the 2020 edition was cancelled completely, for the first time in festival's almost 60 years long history.

Notable participants 

Boban Marković Orchestra
Goran Bregović

In 2010 the organizers issued invitations to Russia and U.S., Dmitry Medvedev and Barack Obama, and Russian Prime Minister Vladimir Putin, to attend the 50th anniversary event.

Winners 

In time, four awards distinguished themselves as the most important. In the descending order of importance, they are: best orchestra, first trumpet, folk playing (all awarded by the jury) and Golden trumpet (voted by the audience). Every performer with three wins in any of the categories is being declared a "master of trumpet". The rules were amended in 2017, so now two of those three wins have to be awards given by the jury. This was done as some very young players won several audience awards due to their popularity. Milovan Babić is considered the most successful performer of all times, with 11 wins in all four categories (from 1972 to 2003). Based on points (awarding 4, 3, 2 and 1 point according to the importance of the award), the list of the most successful trumpeters for the 1961-2018 period is:

 1. 32 points - Fejat Sejdić (1941-2017) ("The master of Guča for all times")
 2. 28 points - Milovan Babić (1950)
 3. 27 points - Slobodan Salijević (1965)
 4. 25 points - Bakija Bakić (1923–89)
 5. 24 points - Raka Kostić (1927–94)
 6. 22 points - Svetozar Lazović (1952)
 7. 21 points - Boban Marković (1964)
 8. 21 points - Milovan Petrović (????)
 9. 20 points - Dejan Petrović (1985; son of Milovan)
 10. 18 points - Ekrem Mamutović sr (1942-2008; later changed name to Milan Mladenović)

See also 
Balkan brass

References

Sources 

Bojanić, Z. M. (2002). Guča, svetska prestonica trube. Edidžija "Zvezdano nebo". Beograd: Udruženje nezavisnih izdavača knjiga.
Boban Markovic Orkester. (2002). Live in Belgrade: the best trumpet of guca.

External links 

 Official website
 UnOfficial Festival website guca.rs
Official website Lucani municipality
Official 2006 website
 UnOfficial website gucha.com
2007 Guča documentary film premiere showing how people invade the sleepy village of Guča for a week of music, drinking, dancing and utter madness
BBC News - Serbian town has much to trumpet
Gucha presentation at FDS
Guca 2010 Photo Gallery by Marien van Bezooijen
Guca 2011 Photo Gallery by Marien van Bezooijen
Guca 2012 Photo Gallery by Marien van Bezooijen
 Guca 2013 Photo Gallery I by Marien van Bezooijen
 Guca 2013 Photo Gallery II by Marien van Bezooijen
  Guca 2014 Photo Gallery I by Marien van Bezooijen

Serbian culture
Music festivals in Serbia
Tourism in Serbia
Music festivals established in 1961
Jazz festivals in Serbia
Folk festivals in Serbia
Music festivals in Yugoslavia